USS Buckley (DE-51) was the lead ship of her class of destroyer escorts in the service with the United States Navy from 1943 to 1946. After spending 23 years in reserve, she was scrapped in 1969.

History
USS Buckley was named in honor of Aviation Ordnanceman John D. Buckley (1920–1941), who was killed in action during the Japanese attack on the Hawaiian Islands on 7 December 1941.

Buckley was launched on 9 January 1943, by Bethlehem-Hingham Shipyard, Inc., Hingham, Massachusetts, sponsored by Mrs. James Buckley, mother of Aviation Ordnanceman Buckley; and commissioned on 30 April 1943.

Battle of the Atlantic
Between July 1943 and 22 April 1944, Buckley operated along the eastern seaboard as training ship for prospective officers and nucleus crews of other destroyer escorts.

On 22 April 1944, she joined hunter-killer Task Group 21.11 (TG 21.11) for a sweep of the North Atlantic and Mediterranean convoy routes. On the morning of 6 May, aircraft from the escort carrier  reported an enemy submarine near Buckley. She steamed toward the surfaced submarine, evading her torpedoes and gunfire, and commenced firing. At 0328 Buckley rammed the German submarine  and then backed off. Shortly thereafter, the submarine struck Buckley, opening a hole in the escort vessel's starboard side. Hand-to-hand combat ensued between crew members of the two combatants on Buckleys foredeck, involving, among other weapons, coffee mugs and shell casings.

Buckley picked up 36 German survivors, transferred them to the Block Island and then retired to New York where she underwent repairs until 14 June 1944.  For this most interesting action, regarded by several high naval officers as being the most "exciting" anti-submarine kill in the Battle of the Atlantic, Buckley personnel were authorized to wear a combat star in the European-African Theater ribbon. The then commanding officer, Lt. Comdr. Brent M. Abel, USNR, of Cambridge, Massachusetts, was awarded the Navy Cross for his part in its execution.

After completing refresher training at Casco Bay, Maine, in July 1944, Buckley escorted two convoys to North Africa (14 July – 7 November 1944). She then operated on anti-submarine and convoy escort duty along the eastern seaboard and in the North Atlantic until June 1945. Buckley escorted one more convoy to Algeria during June–July 1945, before returning to the United States.

Conversion and fate

Upon her return to the east coast, she commenced conversion to a radar picket ship.  In October 1945, she participated in the Navy Day ceremonies at Jacksonville, Florida, and then on 31 October reported to the 16th Fleet at St. Johns River, Florida.  Buckley was placed out of commission in reserve on 3 July 1946.  On 26 April 1949 her classification was changed to DER-51 (radar picket destroyer escort), and on 29 September 1954, she was reclassified back to DE-51'''.Buckley was stricken from the Naval Vessel Register on 1 June 1968; she was sold for scrapping July 1969.

In popular culture
Some scenes in the 1957 movie The Enemy Below (starring Robert Mitchum and Curt Jurgens) seem to be inspired by Buckley's battle with U-66, particularly near the end of the movie where the U.S. Navy destroyer escort grounds on the deck of the submarine. The ship used in the film was the USS Whitehurst (DE-634).

The battle with U-66 is detailed in an episode of the YouTube channel The History Guy: History Deserves to Be Remembered.

Awards
Navy Unit Commendation (for sinking U-66)
American Campaign Medal with one battle star
European-African-Middle Eastern Campaign Medal with two battle stars
World War II Victory Medal

 References 

A 1/249 scale plastic model kit of the USS Buckley is available by Revell Models.

External links

 Historical Record of the USS Buckley
 
Youtube video:  USS Buckley vs U-66 during the Battle of the Atlantic''
1944: May 6: Sinking of U-66 - National Museum of Naval History

Buckley
Buckley
World War II frigates and destroyer escorts of the United States
1943 ships